John Bombay Kamau (born 21 December 1995) is a Kenyan winger currently in the ranks of Kenyan Premier League side Nairobi City Stars.

Club career

Kamau turned out for lower-tier side Vapor Sports before moving to Premiership side Nairobi City Stars in 2018.

After a short stint he joined Tusker F.C. in mid-2018
 till the 2019 season before returning to City Stars in January of year 2020 on a short-term contract. He extended his stay for two seasons following the team's promotion to the top flight.

Honours

Club
Nairobi City Stars
National Super League
 Champions (1): 2019-20

References

External links
 

Living people
1995 births
Nairobi City Stars players
Tusker F.C. players
Kenyan Premier League players
Kenyan footballers